Munsang College (Hong Kong Island) (IMSC) is a top-ranked Christian secondary school located in Sai Wan Ho, Hong Kong, at the waterfront of Aldrich Bay. Established in 1999 by Munsang College Education Council, it operates independently from Munsang College in Kowloon established in 1926. The college was named after two founders Au Tak and Mok Kon Sang. The mottos of the college are "Light And Life" and "All For One, One For All". Dr Yim Chi Shing is the Principal of the college.

It has been using English as the medium of instruction for all subjects excluding Chinese language, Chinese literature, Chinese history, and religious education (Christianity) since the academic year 2010-11. The first cohort using English as the medium of instruction had graduated in 2016. The college has had a Student Association since September 2008.

History

References

.

External links

 Munsang College (Hong Kong Island) School Website

Protestant secondary schools in Hong Kong
Sai Wan Ho